The Athletics at the 2016 Summer Paralympics – Women's 200 metres T36 event at the 2016 Paralympic Games took place on 13 September 2016, at the Estádio Olímpico João Havelange.

Heats

Heat 1 
11:13 12 September 2016:

Heat 2 
11:19 12 September 2016:

Final 
10:50 13 September 2016:

Notes

Athletics at the 2016 Summer Paralympics